Edward George "Ted" Nugee  (9 August 1928 – 30 December 2014) was an English barrister. Nugee was described in his London Times obituary as "one of the pre-eminent Chancery barristers of his generation". He was involved in number of significant cases on tax and pensions, as well as being a regularly published correspondent in letters to the editor of The Times.

Early life, education and military service
Nugee was born in 1928 in Godalming, Surrey, son of Brigadier George Nugee CBE, DSO, MC and his wife, Violet Mary.

Nugee attended Brambletye School in East Grinstead and Radley College in Oxfordshire, from where he won a scholarship to Worcester College, Oxford, to read classics. Before going to University he spent two years on National Service as a gunner in the Royal Artillery, and served in Singapore during the Malayan Emergency. Upon his return to Oxford, Nugee reportedly realised that he had not seen a Latin or Greek text for two years and so abandoned classics in favour of law. He graduated with a double first, and in 1953 was awarded the Eldon Law Scholarship.

After completing his National Service commitment Nugee remained in the Territorial Army and was commissioned into the Intelligence Corps in April 1952. He would serve in the Intelligence Corps until November 1964, having reached the rank of Captain in May 1955 and been awarded the Territorial Decoration in July 1964.

Law
He was called to the bar in 1955 at the Inner Temple and became a pupil at 2 New Square in Lincoln's Inn, but soon thereafter moved to chambers at 3 New Square, later known as Wilberforce Chambers.  He remained there in practice for nearly 60 years until his death, principally in the areas of pensions and tax, and was head of chambers for over 30 years.  He was Treasurer of the Inner Temple in 1996.

In 1962, Nugee was asked to join the legal team advising the Colonial Office on administrative issues in Uganda, then a British protectorate and soon to become independent. His role was to advise on the boundaries of traditional areas and tribal domains;  he took great pleasure in researching the pre-colonial administration of the Baganda people, taking evidence from elders who could personally remember the period before the British arrived in 1898, and was instrumental in advising the Colonial Office to restore to the Baganda people authority over some of their traditional territory.

In 1967 Nugee was made a Junior Counsel for the Land Commission. From 1968 to 1977 he was Counsel for Litigation under the Commons Registration Act 1965. He was also Conveyancing Counsel to the Treasury, the Defence Department, the Ministry of Agriculture & Fisheries and the Forestry Commission. He was appointed Queen's Counsel in 1977.

In addition to his practice Nugee did a great deal of work for the Family Welfare Association, the Mothers' Union, the London Citizens' Advice Bureau, and for Poor Man’s Lawyer in Lewisham.

He also served on the Council of Legal Education from 1967 to 1990, and assisted the Law Commission.

Between 1982 and 1997 he often sat as a Deputy High Court Judge in the Chancery Division.

In 1984 he was appointed chairman of an inquiry set up by the minister of housing into the management problems of privately owned blocks of flats. This resulted in the Landlord and Tenant Act 1987.

In 2011 he was awarded a “Lifetime Achievement” Award for service to the legal profession by a publisher of a legal directory, Chambers and Partners.

Personal life
In 1955, Nugee met and married Rachel Elizabeth Makower, who had worked as a code breaker at Bletchley Park during the Second World War. They had four sons, including Sir Christopher Nugee and Lt Gen Richard Nugee.

Throughout his marriage he attended St John-at-Hampstead, serving latterly as member of the parochial church council. He was a Church Commissioner between 1990 and 2001 and on the Legal Advisory Commission of the General Synod dealing with issues of ecclesiastical law. He inherited from his parents the patronage of the parishes of East Farndon and Farlington and the joint parish of Wymering & Cosham, a responsibility he took seriously and discharged for the remainder of his life. He was also Chairman of the Board of Governors at Brambletye from 1972 until 1977, a member of the Radley College Council for 20 years until 1997, and a member and council member of the Huguenot Society of Great Britain and Ireland, through which he traced his family history back to Huguenot refugees in the 17th century.

References

External links
 Edward Nugee TD QC Chambers Lifetime Achievement Award

1928 births
2014 deaths
People educated at Radley College
Alumni of Worcester College, Oxford
Members of the Inner Temple
People from Godalming
20th-century British lawyers
English barristers
English King's Counsel
20th-century King's Counsel
20th-century English lawyers
20th-century British Army personnel
Royal Artillery soldiers
Intelligence Corps officers